Stephen Kwabena Hammond (born 6 August 1996) is a Ghanaian professional footballer who plays as an attacking midfielder for Greek Super League club Levadiakos.

Honours
Levadiakos
Super League 2: 2021–22

References

1996 births
Living people
Ghanaian footballers
Ghanaian expatriate footballers
Ghanaian expatriate sportspeople in Spain
Ghanaian expatriate sportspeople in Greece
Expatriate footballers in Spain
Expatriate footballers in Greece
Divisiones Regionales de Fútbol players
Segunda División B players
Tercera División players
Super League Greece players
Super League Greece 2 players
CD Leganés B players
RCD Mallorca B players
Doxa Drama F.C. players
Levadiakos F.C. players
Association football midfielders